Bojana Jovanovski Petrović (née Jovanovski; , ; born 31 December 1991) is a former Serbian tennis player.

In her career, Jovanovski won two singles titles on the WTA Tour and one WTA 125 tournaments singles title. On 4 August 2014, she reached her best singles ranking of world No. 32. On 3 November 2014, she peaked at No. 203 in the WTA doubles rankings.

Playing for Serbia Fed Cup team, she has a win–loss record of 6–11 in Fed Cup competition.

Early life and career
Jovanovski began playing tennis aged seven at the Red Star Tennis Club. Aged 12, she won the Serbian national U–14 championships and was the finalist of the U–16. She turned professional in 2006 and played her first junior event at the tournament in Pančevo, Serbia, losing in straight sets to Ana Veselinović. That year, she also lost to Simona Halep in the finals of the Heiveld Indoor Junior Championships. In 2007, Jovanovski won junior events in Citta' Di Santa Croce, defeating Michelle Larcher de Brito, and reached the finals in Prato and Milan, losing to Romana Tabaková and Anastasia Pivovarova, respectively.

Jovanovski would play at numerous junior Grand Slam tournaments. Her best result came at Wimbledon, where she was defeated by Madison Brengle in the quarterfinals. In 2008 Jovanovski decided to pursue her professional career on the ITF Circuit, but would also play at the junior Grand Slam events. She would reach the quarterfinals at the Australian Open and Wimbledon, losing to Arantxa Rus and Laura Robson, respectively. Both Rus and Robson later won the tournaments. Jovanovski's highest junior ranking was world number 5, which she achieved on 7 April 2008.

Professional career

2006–2009
Jovanovski made her professional debut on the ITF Circuit in 2006 in Prokuplje, Serbia where she lost to Karolina Jovanović in the second round. Two years later, she won her first ITF title at that same tournament, beating Karin Morgošová in the final. In 2008 Jovanovski reached an additional three finals, winning two of them.

She continued playing on the ITF Circuit, reaching the semifinals of three events – Belek, Sarajevo and Toruń – being defeated by Tetyana Arefyeva, Ana Jovanović, and Oksana Kalashnikova, respectively. Jovanovski played qualifications for the 2009 US Open but lost, however, to American Carly Gullickson. On 20 November 2009, Jovanovski reached the final of an ITF event in Pune, India but lost to Fujiwara. On 29 November 2009, she reached the final of an ITF event in Toyota, Aichi but lost to the former world No. 4 Kimiko Date-Krumm.

2010: WTA Tour debut
At her first ITF tournament in 2010, in Quanzhou, Jovanovski reached the semifinals, losing in three sets to fellow Serb Aleksandra Krunić. She then played in the qualification tournament for the Australian Open, but lost to Kathrin Wörle, despite having a match point in the third set. Jovanovski was, once again, part of the Serbian Fed Cup team along with Jelena Janković, Ana Ivanovic and Ana Jovanović in the 2–3 loss against Russia in the World Group. She was then awarded with a wild card for the main draw of Malaysian Open. On her WTA Tour debut, she beat Vitalia Diatchenko in straight sets. However, Jovanovski then lost to the first seed Elena Dementieva in round two.

On 24 April, Jovanovski made her debut for the Serbia Fed Cup team, in the World Group Playoffs against Slovakia. She lost her first singles match to Daniela Hantuchová, but then won her second rubber against Magdaléna Rybáriková. Jovanovski and Janković lost their doubles match to Hantuchová and Rybáriková for the final 3–2 scoreline for Slovakia. At the Grand Prix SAR La Princesse Lalla Meryem, her second career WTA event, she defeated Barbora Záhlavová-Strýcová in the first round, but then lost to the fifth seed Angelique Kerber in the second. Jovanovski qualified for her third WTA Tour tournament at the Internazionali BNL d'Italia, beating Nuria Llagostera Vives and former world No. 8 Alicia Molik, but then lost to Yaroslava Shvedova in the first round. In May, Jovanovski took part in the Warsaw Open, beating former world No. 5 Anna Chakvetadze to reach the main draw. She subsequently lost to Sara Errani in the first round.

Her next tournament was the French Open, where she defeated María Irigoyen in the first round of the qualifying stage, but then fell to Anastasia Pivovarova in the second. She then suffered losses in the semifinal of the ITF event in Maribor and the Aegon International qualifications, but managed to enter into the main draw at Wimbledon. Jovanovski defeated Casey Dellacqua in the first round, but lost to eighth seed Victoria Azarenka in the second. Her result at Wimbledon helped her ranking rise to world No. 93. Jovanovski then played at the Banka Koper Slovenia Open but lost to compatriot and world No. 2 Jelena Janković in the opening round. At the İstanbul Cup, she won three matches in straight sets to qualify for the main draw, but lost to Elena Vesnina in the first round. In August, Jovanovski qualified for the main draw of the first Premier 5 of the US Open Series, the Western & Southern Financial Group Women's Open. She upset the 14th seed Aravane Rezaï in the first round, but lost to Akgul Amanmuradova in the following round in straight sets. Jovanovski then attempted to qualify for the Rogers Cup and the Pilot Pen Tennis tournaments, but fell to Sorana Cîrstea and Elena Vesnina respectively. Jovanovski played her second Grand Slam event at the US Open, but was defeated by Anastasia Rodionova in the first round. She also competed in women's doubles partnering with Janković, but they were defeated by Kimiko Date-Krumm and Ayumi Morita.

Jovanovski then played at the Guangzhou International Open, but lost to Alla Kudryavtseva in the first round. She also lost in the first round of the Hansol Korea Open to Kirsten Flipkens, after easily winning three qualification matches. Jovanovski was then defeated in the first round of the Toray Pan Pacific Open qualifications by Pauline Parmentier. However, she managed to turn around the early losses by qualifying for the main draw of China Open, her first ever Premier Mandatory tournament. In the opening round, she defeated a fellow qualifier, the 2009 US Open quarterfinalist Kateryna Bondarenko. She then upset former world number one and good friend Janković in the second round, marking her first victory over a former world No. 1 and a top-ten player. However, she was beaten by Shahar Pe'er in the third round. Jovanovski then participated at the ITF tournaments in Torhout, Poitiers and Taipei, defeating players such as Sania Mirza, Rika Fujiwara and Noppawan Lertcheewakarn, but without much further success. She finished the year as the youngest player in the top-100 of the WTA rankings.

In December, Jovanovski played at the ITF tournament in Dubai. She defeated Julia Babilon in the first round, Petra Martić in the second and world No. 45 Anastasija Sevastova in the quarterfinals, then former world No. 16 Anabel Medina Garrigues in her semifinal, before losing to Sania Mirza in the final. A week later, in Pune, Jovanovski won her fourth ITF title, and her first since 2008, defeating Nina Bratchikova.

2011: Breakthrough year

Jovanovski opened the season in Brisbane, defeating Anastasia Rodionova in the first round. She then lost to Anastasia Pavlyuchenkova in the second. The week after, Jovanovski qualified for the Medibank International Sydney. She defeated Kaia Kanepi, Aravane Rezaï and Flavia Pennetta, but lost her first WTA semifinal to future champion Li Na. At the Australian Open, Jovanovski defeated Chang Kai-chen in the first round but lost to the second seed Vera Zvonareva in round two. She also played doubles partnering with Varvara Lepchenko; they lost to Kimiko Date-Krumm and Zhang Shuai. Jovanovski was the highest ranked Serbian player in the Serbia Fed Cup team for the World Group II rubber against Canada. She played alongside Ana Jovanović, Aleksandra Krunić and Tamara Čurović against Rebecca Marino, Aleksandra Wozniak, Marie-Ève Pelletier and Sharon Fichman in Novi Sad. She won both of her singles matches against Wozniak and Marino. In the doubles match, Jovanovski and Krunić defeated Fichman and Pelletier to guarantee Serbia a spot in the World Group Playoffs.

Jovanovski lost the first round of the Dubai Tennis Championships to the world No. 26 Yanina Wickmayer. She qualified for the Qatar Ladies Open, but lost to Sania Mirza in the first round. Jovanovski was the eighth seed at the Malaysian Open where she defeated Tamarine Tanasugarn and Urszula Radwańska before losing to former world No. 4 and eventual champion Jelena Dokić in the quarterfinals. She then suffered two consecutive first–round losses, at the BNP Paribas Open to Urszula Radwańska, and at the Sony Ericsson Open to Monica Niculescu. On 25 March 2011, Jovanovski was awarded with the Heart Award, given by the Fed Cup for her performances in her national colours. She then played for Serbia in a World Group Play–off rubber against Slovakia. Though she lost her singles match to Dominika Cibulková in three sets, Serbia managed to qualify for the 2012 World Group.

At the Madrid Open, Jovanovski defeated Gréta Arn in the first round, but then lost to world No. 1 Caroline Wozniacki in the second. She then lost to the tenth seed Shahar Pe'er in the first round of the Italian Open. Jovanovski defeated Alla Kudryavtseva in the first round of the Internationaux de Strasbourg, but was defeated by Anabel Medina Garrigues in the round two. Jovanovski lost to the 15th seed Andrea Petkovic in the first round of the French Open. Partnering with Varvara Lepchenko, she lost to Lourdes Domínguez Lino and Laura Pous Tió in the first round of women's doubles.

Jovanovski played her first grass-court event of the year at the Aegon Classic. Though she was seeded tenth, she was defeated by qualifier Sarah Gronert in the first round. Jovanovski then qualified for the Aegon International, and defeated Anastasia Pavlyuchenkova in the first round. She lost to the seventh seed Samantha Stosur in the second. At the Wimbledon Championships, Jovanovski was defeated by Simona Halep in the first round. Partnering with Jelena Dokić, she lost to Liezel Huber and Lisa Raymond in the first round of women's doubles.

Jovanovski has been seeded fifth at the Citi Open. She defeated qualifier Petra Rampre in the first round and Jill Craybas in the second, before losing to former world No. 3 and eventual champion Nadia Petrova in the quarterfinals. At the Mercury Insurance Open, she was defeated by the ninth seed Roberta Vinci in the first round. Jovanovski would then beat Melanie Oudin and Arantxa Parra Santonja to qualify for the Rogers Cup. She was leading 2–0 when Jelena Dokić retired from their match in the first round. Jovanovski was then beaten by former world No. 1 Maria Sharapova in the second round. After defeating Anna Tatishvili and Akgul Amanmuradova to qualify for the event, Jovanovski was beaten by the 17th seed Yanina Wickmayer in the first round of the Western & Southern Open. She then lost to Gisela Dulko in the first round of the Texas Tennis Open. At the US Open, Jovanovski lost in the first round to the 28th seed and former world No. 1 Serena Williams. She and Varvara Lepchenko were beaten by eighth seeds Andrea Hlaváčková and Lucie Hradecká in the first round of women's doubles.

Jovanovski then lost her first-round matches in four consecutive tournaments, the Tashkent Open, the Guangzhou International, the Pan Pacific Open and the China Open. Jovanovski won her first match after the streak of seven first–round losses at the Kremlin Cup, beating Alona Bondarenko. She would then lose in the second round to Vera Zvonareva.

2012: First WTA title
Jovanovski began her 2012 season at the Brisbane International. She defeated Casey Dellacqua, a wild-card entrant, in the first round, but then lost to the fourth seed Serena Williams. She then played the qualification tournament for the Apia International Sydney qualifications, defeating Tamira Paszek and Virginie Razzano, before losing to Stefanie Vögele. At the Australian Open, Jovanovski lost in the first round to Casey Dellacqua. In doubles, she and Michaëlla Krajicek were defeated by Alla Kudryavtseva and Ekaterina Makarova in the first round. Jovanovski then played for the Serbia Fed Cup team in the World Group first round against Belgium, scoring one loss in singles, but a win in both singles and doubles to help Serbia advance to the semifinals.

At the Qatar Total Open, Jovanovski defeated Raquel Kops-Jones in the first round of qualification, eventually losing to Aleksandra Wozniak in the second. She then lost in the second qualifying round at the Dubai Tennis Championships to Mona Barthel, having previously beat Kurumi Nara in straight sets. Jovanovski went on to suffer two consecutive first–round losses at the Malaysian Open and the BNP Paribas Open. She then played at the ITF event in the Bahamas, where she lost in the semifinals to Aleksandra Wozniak. Jovanovski received a wildcard for the Sony Ericsson Open, and was defeated by Lourdes Domínguez Lino in the first round.

Jovanovski then played at the e-Boks Copenhagen Open. She had defeated Stefanie Vögele, and upset the fourth seed Monica Niculescu, before losing in the quarterfinals to Petra Martić. Jovanovski then played for Serbia in the Fed Cup semifinals against Russia. Although she and Aleksandra Krunić lost their doubles match to Maria Kirilenko and Elena Vesnina, Serbia progressed through to the final with a 3–2 win. After that, Jovanovski tried to qualify for the Budapest Grand Prix and the Madrid Open, but suffered two first–round losses to Romana Tabaková, and Marta Domachowska respectively. She then qualified for the Brussels Open, where she lost in the second round to the eight seed Kaia Kanepi. At the French Open, Jovanovski lost to world No. 3 Agnieszka Radwańska.

Jovanovski played her first grass–court tournament of the year at the Aegon Classic, where she suffered a first–round loss to Michelle Larcher de Brito, a qualifier. She then tried to qualify for the Aegon International, but lost to Laura Robson in the final qualification round. At the Wimbledon Championships, Jovanovski led in the first–round match against Eleni Daniilidou, when the Greek retired. She then lost to 15th seed Sabine Lisicki in three sets. Jovanovski then entered the Baku Cup seeded fifth. She defeated Lesia Tsurenko in the first round, Valeria Solovyeva in the second, fellow Serb Aleksandra Krunić in the quarterfinals, and the second seed Alexandra Panova in the semifinals to advance in her first career WTA final. She defeated another first–time finalist Julia Cohen to win her first WTA Tour title.

Following the capture of her first WTA title, Jovanovski went on to lose in the first rounds of her following three tournaments – the Citi Open, the Rogers Cup and the Western & Southern Open. At the Texas Tennis Open, Jovanovski defeated Alexandra Panova, and Mirjana Lučić, and led the match against Peng Shuai, when Peng retired, to reach the semifinal, where she lost to the eventual champion Roberta Vinci. At the final Grand Slam tournament of the season, the US Open, she beat Mona Barthel in the first round, but went on to lose to Dominika Cibulková in the second round. Jovanovski then reached the quarterfinals of the Tashkent Open by defeating Dinah Pfizenmaier and Eleni Daniilidou, before falling to Donna Vekić. At her last four WTA tournaments of the season, Jovanovski reached the second round of the Guangzhou International Open, being defeated by Chanelle Scheepers; the third round of the Pan Pacific Open, losing to Caroline Wozniacki; the third round of the China Open, losing to Marion Bartoli; and the first round of the Kremlin Cup, being defeated by Sofia Arvidsson.

Jovanovski was a member of the Serbia Fed Cup team during the 2012 World Group Final, but did not play any matches. She and Aleksandra Krunić were scheduled to play doubles against Hlaváčková and Hradecká, but the dead rubber was cancelled as the Czech Republic had already won 3–1. As a result of their success in the 2012 Fed Cup, the team was honoured with the Award of Olympic Committee of Serbia as Women's Team of the Year.

2013: Australian Open fourth round
Jovanovski played her first event of the season at the Shenzhen Open, where she was seeded eighth. She defeated Alexandra Cadanțu in the first round and Duan Yingying in the second, but lost in the quarterfinals to Li Na, who went on to win the tournament. Jovanovski then played in Hobart, where she defeated María Teresa Torró Flor, before losing to Kirsten Flipkens in the second round. At the Australian Open, Jovanovski again defeated Torró Flor, the 17th seed Lucie Šafářová, and Kimiko Date-Krumm, before losing to eventual semifinalist Sloane Stephens in the fourth round. This had been her best career Grand Slam result of her career. In doubles, Jovanovski partnered with Melinda Czink to triumph over Simona Halep and Arantxa Rus in the first round, but then fell to Natalie Grandin and Vladimíra Uhlířová in the second.

She then lost seven matches in a row. Four of them were at Fed Cup. First Serbia played in World Group against Slovakia and lost 2–3. Jovanovski lost her two single matches. First to Daniela Hantuchová and then to Jana Čepelová in a tight match. Serbia then played play-offs to stay in the World Group, but lost to Germany 2–3. Ana Ivanovic won two singles matches, but Jovanovski lost her two. First to Angelique Kerber in two sets, and then to Mona Barthel in three sets.

Her first win after the Australian Open was at Rome in the first round. She defeated former world No. 1 Caroline Wozniacki. In the second round she lost to Jelena Janković. At the French Open she reached third round losing in two tight sets to Svetlana Kuznetsova; in second she defeated Wozniacki again. At Wimbledon, she reached the second round. Later in the summer, she played in Baku and New Haven. There she won just one match. At the final Grand Slam of the year, the US Open, she beat Andrea Petkovic in the first round, but lost to Petra Kvitová in round two.

At the Tashkent Open Jovanovski won her second WTA title, coming through seven matches in eight days. She defeated Olga Govortsova in the final in three sets. In Guangzhou, Jovanovski defeated Sorana Cîrstea in round one. But she lost in the second round to Vania King, despite winning nine games in a row after the first set loss. She also won the title at the WTA 125K series event in Ningbo; beating Zhang Shuai in the final, again in three sets.

In Beijing Jovanovski once again defeated Cîrstea. But in the second round she was declassed by home favourite, Li Na, with Jovanovski winning just one game. But she finished a season in a better way, reaching the quarterfinals of Luxembourg. She defeated 2011 Roland Garros champion Francesca Schiavone in round one, and Hsieh Su-wei. In the quarterfinals she lost to the top seed and eventual champion, Caroline Wozniacki, in three sets.

2014
Jovanovski started season playing in Shenzhen, suffering a first round loss to German qualifier Anna-Lena Friedsam. She then beat Annika Beck and Olivia Rogowska in Hobart, before losing to top seed Samantha Stosur in the quarterfinals. At the Australian Open, Jovanovski wasn't seeded at first. But, after the withdrawal of Jamie Hampton who was seeded, Bojana became the 33rd seed and she was moved to the other side of draw. She started well with a three-set win over Jana Čepelová, but lost in the second round to Yvonne Meusburger.

After Melbourne, Jovanovski moved seven places down on rankings. But, worse still, suffered a wrist injury, and faced a spell on the sidelines. She tried to play at the Open GDF Suez in Paris, but lost to Andrea Petkovic. As a result, she was forced to withdraw from the tournaments in Doha, Dubai and also the Fed Cup.

Consequences of injuries continued for the results. Jovanovski lost convincingly at next four events in Acapulco, Indian Wells, Miami, and also first clay tournament of season in Marrakech, winning a total of just two matches.

In Oeiras, Jovanovski defeated Monica Puig in round one to face Elena Vesnina in round two, serving for the match and holding a match point for her first quarterfinal since Hobart, but lost in three sets. In the first round of Madrid she outclassed Karin Knapp, but lost in the second round to countrywoman Ana Ivanovic. Including that loss in Madrid, Jovanovski lost then six times in a row, including Roland Garros.

Jovanovski travelled to Wimbledon with a 7–15 win–loss season record, but scored her first win since Madrid with victory over Johanna Larsson. After that she came up with her best performance of the year, stunning eighth seed Victoria Azarenka in three sets to reach the third round. It was her fourth top-10 win. She however missed a big chance to reach next round, falling to Czech qualifier and world No. 176 Tereza Smitková. Jovanovski had a match point in second set, then served two times for a match in final set (incl. another match point), but couldn't cross the finishing line. She also played in doubles, partnering with Eva Hrdinová, and mixed doubles too, with Mate Pavić, losing in the second round in both competitions.

Jovanovski then played in Istanbul, losing in the second round. Jovanovski then played in Baku, and reached second final at that tournament after beating Stefanie Vögele. She lost in two sets to Elina Svitolina in final. This was the first final which she lost, after winning her previous two. She went on to North America where the first tournament she played was at Washington. Although being tired, she reached the quarterfinals, losing to Marina Erakovic for the second time in a year. She arrived in Montréal but soon found a downturn in form. All of her next series of matches in North America were lost in two sets: in Montreal, Cincinnati, New Haven and the US Open. Moving to Asia, Jovanovski reached the Tashkent final, but in China played three tournaments, winning not a single match.

2015
Jovanovski played two Australian Open warm-up events, and reached the second round of both. At the Australian Open itself, she lost in the first round to Roberta Vinci. Bad form continued, with losses in the first round of Doha and Kuala Lumpur. She, however, managed to win one match in both Indian Wells and Miami, with a notable scalp coming against Mona Barthel in Miami.

The clay court season began for Jovanovski in Marakech, where she lost to third seed Flavia Pennetta. In Madrid, she played qualifications, but lost there in the second round to Mariana Duque. However, at the next tournament in Rome, Jovanovski finally won back-to-back matches. After winning two in qualifying, she then beat top players to reach third round, Caroline Garcia and top-20 player Madison Keys. She was finally stopped in round three by Maria Sharapova.

2016–2017: Surgery and rehabilitation
With the condition of her wrist and right shoulder that has been bothering her for the past three seasons worsening, Jovanovski played in only five matches in 2016, each time losing in the first round in straight sets. Following the French Open first round loss to Agnieszka Radwańska, Jovanovski said that she was going to miss all tournaments on grass court, including Wimbledon, to try to prepare for the second half of the season. However, after unsuccessfully trying to rehabilitate with various non-surgery methods she notified the public in early July 2016 that on the advice of Spanish doctors she has decided to undergo surgery in an attempt to continue with her tennis career. With expected recovery period of four to five months, Jovanovski said she expects to be back in time for the Australian series in January 2017. In an interview in September 2016, Jovanovski said she hopes to return to practice in November and that although she could use protected ranking to play in the Australian Open she doesn't want to use it for a tournament she isn't ready for, only wanting to return once she is fit, and deemed it unlikely to play in tournaments before February 2017.

In July 2017, after having her first training after more than a year, it was speculated Jovanovski might return to court in autumn. Later in July, she said she doesn't want to squander wildcards for tournaments at the end of the season when it is unrealistic for her to be completely ready and said she will most likely be ready for the beginning of 2018. In September 2017, Jovanovski confirmed that she will return to court in early 2018.

2018: Return from injury, comeback
After almost a two-year layoff due to injury, Jovanovski played her first tournament at the St. Petersburg Ladies' Trophy in late January. She lost in the first round of qualifying to Océane Dodin in straight sets. She then resumed playing ITF tournaments in mid-April.

On 28 November, she announced her retirement from professional tennis.

2021: Failed second comeback
Jovanovski Petrović became eligible to play professional tournaments again from 28 November 2020 by submitting to be available for out-of-competition doping tests. However, it was later announced that she would retire on 20 November 2021 without having played a single comeback match.

Playing style and equipment
Jovanovski is an aggressive baseline player. She cites forehand as her favourite shot and hard as her favourite court surface, and stated she would like to improve her court movement and become mentally stronger. Since the 2011 US Open she wears Adidas instead of Nike sports gear and uses Head rackets.

Personal life
Jovanovski was born to father Zoran, a former football player, and mother Snežana, and also has a sister Viktorija. Her father and coach Zoran Jovanovski introduced her to tennis when she was aged 7. Jovanovski cites Maria Sharapova as her idol for being "an aggressive player and a strong personality". She is good friends with Serbian tennis player Jelena Janković. Jovanovski is fluent in Serbian and English. Besides Head, Jovanovski is also sponsored by Knjaz Miloš. In November 2016 she married her boyfriend Miloš Petrović.

National identity
During the ITF tournament in Dubai in December 2010, it was rumoured Jovanovski would play for Macedonia, reportedly for "being in the shadow of Jelena and Ana". Her father and coach Zoran Jovanovski denied the rumours at once, saying that "Bojana had never even been in Macedonia" and that the rumour was "made up because of her surname".

Performance timelines

Only main-draw results in WTA Tour, Grand Slam tournaments, Fed Cup and Olympic Games are included in win–loss records.

Singles

Doubles

WTA career finals

Singles: 4 (2 titles, 2 runner–ups)

WTA Challenger finals

Singles: 1 title

ITF finals

Singles (4 titles, 4 runner–ups)

Doubles: 1 runner–up

Team competition

Finals: 1 runner–up

Fed Cup participating

Singles (4–9)

Doubles (2–2)

Record against other players

Wins over top 10 players

Awards
 2011 – Fed Cup Heart Award (World Group / World Group II first round)
 2012 – Award of Olympic Committee of Serbia for Women's Team of the Year (as part of Serbia Fed Cup team)

Notes

References

External links

 
 
 

1991 births
Living people
Tennis players from Belgrade
Serbian female tennis players